Michael Bryant Eagles (born March 7, 1963) is a Canadian former professional ice hockey forward who played sixteen seasons in the National Hockey League. He is currently the Athletic Director of St. Thomas University in Fredericton, New Brunswick.

Pre-NHL
Eagles won two Ontario Hockey League championships (1981 and 1982) and the Memorial Cup (1982) with the Kitchener Rangers.

NHL career
Eagles was drafted 116th overall by the Quebec Nordiques in the 1981 NHL Entry Draft. He played 853 career NHL games, scoring 74 goals and 122 assists for 196 points. Throughout his career, Eagles played for the Quebec Nordiques (1982-1988), the Chicago Blackhawks (1988-1990), the Winnipeg Jets (1990-1994), and the Washington Capitals (1994-2000). During his time with the Capitals, he played in the 1998 Stanley Cup Finals against the Detroit Red Wings.

Post NHL
In 2002, he was named head coach of the St. Thomas University Tommies of the Canadian Interuniversity Sport conference. During his first year, he led the Tommies to a league championship, and was also named CIS coach of the year. In 2011, he left his coaching position to become St Thomas's Athletic Director.

International play

Eagles made an international debut for Team Canada at the 1983 World Junior Ice Hockey Championships in the Soviet Union. As a member of the team, he won a bronze medal.

Career statistics

Regular season and playoffs

International

External links
 
 Profile at hockeydraftcentral.com
 Profile at legends of hockey.net
 Profile at New Brunswick Sports Hall of Fame

References

1963 births
Billings Bighorns players
Canadian ice hockey left wingers
Chicago Blackhawks players
Fredericton Express players
Ice hockey people from New Brunswick
Indianapolis Ice players
Kitchener Rangers players
Melville Millionaires players
Living people
People from Kings County, New Brunswick
Quebec Nordiques draft picks
Quebec Nordiques players
Washington Capitals players
Winnipeg Jets (1979–1996) players